Buel Eldridge Hutchinson (November 26, 1826March 10, 1903) was an American lawyer and Republican politician.  He served two years in the Wisconsin State Senate and two years in the State Assembly.  Some historical documents spell his first name Buell.

Biography

Born in Jefferson County, New York, he was educated at Potsdam Academy. In 1848 he moved to Prairie du Chien, Wisconsin and was admitted to the Wisconsin bar in 1854. He served in the Wisconsin State Assembly in 1856 and 1878 and in the Wisconsin State Senate from 1860 to 1861.  He was appointed district attorney of Crawford County in 1857 due to the resignation of the incumbent.  During the American Civil War, Hutchinson served in the Union Army in the commissary. He moved to Madison, Wisconsin, where he served in the Wisconsin State Assembly for the second time. From 1882 to 1886, Hutchinson served as receiver of the United States Land Office in Aberdeen, Dakota Territory.

In 1901, Hutchinson moved to Chicago, Illinois, where he died on March 10, 1903.  Some sources misstate his death year as 1902, but his death was formally announced in the March 13, 1903, edition of the Chicago Tribune.

References

External links

1826 births
1903 deaths
People from Henderson, New York
People from Prairie du Chien, Wisconsin
Politicians from Madison, Wisconsin
Politicians from Chicago
People from Aberdeen, South Dakota
People of Wisconsin in the American Civil War
Wisconsin lawyers
Members of the Wisconsin State Assembly
Wisconsin state senators
Dakota Territory officials
Lawyers from Chicago
Lawyers from Madison, Wisconsin
Union Army officers
19th-century American politicians
Military personnel from Illinois